Tyler John Garratt (born 26 October 1996) is an English professional footballer who plays as a defender for Cymru Premier side Flint Town United F.C..

Early life
Garratt was born in Lincoln and joined Bolton Wanderers in 2013.

Club career
Garratt has been with Bolton Wanderers since the youth team and made his first team debut on 23 April 2016, coming on as a substitute for Darren Pratley at Cardiff City in the Football League Championship, giving away a last minute penalty in their 2–1 loss. He made his first start the following week in the team's 1–0 home victory over Hull City.

On 28 June 2016, Garratt joined Doncaster Rovers for an undisclosed fee.

On 2 August 2018, Garratt joined fellow League One side AFC Wimbledon on a season-long loan deal. He scored his first goal for Wimbledon in an EFL Trophy tie against Stevenage on 6 November 2018.

He was released by Doncaster at the end of the 2018–19 season.

On 11 October 2019, Garratt signed for Stockport County on a short team deal. On 7 February 2020, he was loaned out to Wrexham until the end of the 2019–20 season.

He signed for Bangor City for the 2021–22 season.  In November 2021 he moved to Cefn Druids.

Career statistics

Club

References

External links

 
 

1996 births
Living people
Sportspeople from Lincoln, England
English footballers
Association football defenders
Bolton Wanderers F.C. players
Doncaster Rovers F.C. players
Stockport County F.C. players
Wrexham A.F.C. players
English Football League players
Chorley F.C. players
Bangor City F.C. players
Cefn Druids A.F.C. players
Cymru Premier players